William Haddow Pettigrew (born 2 October 1953) is a Scottish former footballer, who played as a striker for Motherwell, Dundee United, Hearts, Morton and Hamilton Academical. Pettigrew also represented Scotland and the Scottish League XI.

Club career
Pettigrew started his career with Hibernian, but left them for junior club East Kilbride Thistle after failing to make a first-team breakthrough.

He joined Motherwell in 1972, where he had his most prolific goalscoring spell, averaging better than a goal every two league games. He ended the 1975–76 season as the highest scorer in the Scottish Premier Division at the age of 22. He repeated the feat when two years later in 1977–78. In 2019 it was announced that Pettigrew was to be inducted into the Motherwell F.C. Hall of Fame.

In 1979, Dundee United purchased Pettigrew for £100,000. He went on to win the 1979 Scottish League Cup Final with United, scoring two goals in a 3–0 replay win against Aberdeen. He also played in the winning 1980 Final team, but this time the goals were scored by the two strikers who were the club's first choice pairing for the next few seasons, Paul Sturrock and Davie Dodds.

In 1981, Pettigrew moved to Heart of Midlothian for a £120,000 fee, going on to achieve promotion to the Premier Division at the end of the 1982-83 season. He joined Morton in 1984 for one season, then ended his playing career the following season after playing a small number of games for Hamilton Academical.

International career
It was at Motherwell that he won five caps for Scotland, 4 in 1976 and 1 in 1977. Scotland won all five games, with Pettigrew scoring a goal in each of his first two appearances. He also played in two games for the Scottish Football League XI in 1978 that both ended in 1-1 draws, giving Pettigrew an unbeaten career as an internationalist of seven games. He scored the Scottish League goal in the second of those two games. Having debuted for Scotland aged 22, his last full cap was aged 23 and his international career at all levels was over aged 25.

Honours 
Dundee United
 Scottish League Cup: 1979–80, 1980–81

Heart of Midlothian
 SFL First Division promotion: 1982–83  

 Scotland
 British Home Championship: 1976–77, 1977–78

References 

1953 births
Association football forwards
Dundee United F.C. players
East Kilbride Thistle F.C. players
Greenock Morton F.C. players
Hamilton Academical F.C. players
Heart of Midlothian F.C. players
Hibernian F.C. players
Living people
Motherwell F.C. players
Footballers from Motherwell
Scotland international footballers
Scotland under-23 international footballers
Scottish Football League players
Scottish Football League representative players
Scottish footballers
Scottish Junior Football Association players
Scottish league football top scorers
Scotland junior international footballers